Edward Santry  (1861 – March 6, 1899) was an American professional baseball player who played in six Major League Baseball games for the Detroit Wolverines in August 1884.

Early years
Santry was born in Chicago, Illinois, in 1861. His father, John Santry, was an immigrant from Ireland who worked in Chicago as a stonemason.  His mother, Ellen, was also an Irish immigrant.

Professional baseball
Santry made his debut in Major League Baseball on August 7, 1884, with the Detroit Wolverines.  His major league career lasted less than a week, with his last major league game on August 12, 1884.  Santry compiled a .182 batting average and scored one run in 22 at bats for the Wolverines.

In 1886, Santry played minor league baseball for Oshkosh in the Northwestern League and the Memphis Grays of the Southern Association. He was also a "player of note in Chicago semi-professional circles."

Later years
Santry died in March 1899 in Chicago.  He was buried at Calvary Cemetery in Evanston, Illinois.

Santry should not be confused with Eddie Santry, a fellow Chicago native who held the featherweight boxing championship from 1899 to 1900.

References

1861 births
1899 deaths
Major League Baseball shortstops
Detroit Wolverines players
19th-century baseball players
Memphis Grays players
Oshkosh (minor league baseball) players
Baseball players from Illinois